NGC 6866 is an open cluster in the constellation Cygnus. It was discovered by Caroline Herschel on 23 July 1783.

References

 Simbad
 NGC 6866
 Webda

External links
 
 

Open clusters
Cygnus (constellation)
6866
17830723